Hallowed Ground is the second studio album by Violent Femmes, released in June 1984. Like the band's first album, the songs were mostly written by singer/guitarist/lyricist Gordon Gano when he was in high school. "Country Death Song", for example, written by Gano during his high school classes, was inspired by the tradition of folk songs about "terrible, horrific stories". A departure from the straightforward rock style of their debut, Hallowed Ground was considerably divisive amongst fans and critics, with many at the time incorrectly thinking Gano's Christian lyrics were ironic.

Background
The songs were written before their first album, with multiple albums' worth of songs ready, the band decided to focus on more pop songs for their debut album and 'confuse people' with the more experimental songs that ended up as Hallowed Ground. They also stated a goal of "being unpredictable" "Country Death Song" was the first song Gano played to Ritchie after meeting in high school.

The Christian-related lyrics on Hallowed Ground were thought by some to be ironic, despite Gano being a devout Baptist. The other two members of Violent Femmes were atheists, and initially refused to perform those songs, but after their debut had been recorded, they relented and several of Gano's religion-themed songs were recorded for Hallowed Ground. Gano stated in 1989, "At the time, Brian (Ritchie) was very aggressively anti-anything Christian. He said he didn't want to be playing in a band that was expressing something that he felt so vehemently against."
Avant-garde musician John Zorn plays saxophone and clarinet on "Black Girls", and the group Horns of Dilemma perform clarinet and trombone on the rest of the album.

Album artwork
The album artwork is a photo of a sculpture created by Mary Nohl.

Reception

AllMusic, in a 4.5 out of 5 star review, described the album as a "hellfire-and-brimstone-beaten exorcism that both enraged and enthralled critics and fans alike". Robert Christgau gave the album a negative review, stating "everything you might hum along with on the sequel was invented generations ago by better men than he", as well as criticizing the song "Black Girls" for perceived racism and homophobia. Robert Palmer described the album as having "a subterranean mother lode of apocalyptic religion, murder, and madness that has lurked just under the surface of hillbilly music and blues since the 19th century".

Legacy
Orlando Weekly described the album as both underrated and divisive. The Phoenix New Times, in a 30-year anniversary look-back, called the album the band's "finest musical effort" and praised Gano's lyrics as his "definitive moment as a lyricist." They also stated the album was an early predictor of the alternative country movement.

Brian Ritchie was interviewed in 2018 about the album's divisive legacy:

Ritchie later revealed Hallowed Ground was the band's favorite album, and singled out "Never Tell" as his favorite song to play.

Track listing

Personnel
Violent Femmes
 Gordon Gano – vocals, acoustic guitar (1, 2, 4, 7, 9), electric guitar (3, 5, 6, 8), violin (4)
 Brian Ritchie – acoustic bass (1, 2, 4, 7, 9), electric bass (3, 5, 6, 8), slide bass (8), celesta (5), marimba (2), jews' harp (8), vocals (2, 3, 6, 7, 8, 9)
 Victor DeLorenzo – tranceaphone (1, 2, 4, 7, 8), acoustic and electric drum kits (1, 3, 5, 6, 8, 9), stompatron (8), percussion (8), vocals (all songs except 1)

Additional musicians
 Mark Van Hecke – piano on "Hallowed Ground" and "It's Gonna Rain", organ on "I Know That It's True but I'm Sorry to Say"
 Tony Trischka – banjo on "Country Death Song" and "It's Gonna Rain"
 Christina Houghton – autoharp on "Jesus Walking on the Water"
 Peter Balestrieri – vocals on "Jesus Walking on the Water", tenor saxophone on "Black Girls", harmonica on "It's Gonna Rain"
 Cynthia Gano Lewis – vocals on "Jesus Walking on the Water"
 Drake Scott – cornetto on "Black Girls", sackbut on "Sweet Misery Blues"
 John Zorn – alto saxophone, clarinet and game calls on "Black Girls"
 John Tanner – clarinet on "Sweet Misery Blues"
 Horns of Dilemma - clarinet and trombone

Production
 Mark Van Hecke – production
 John Tanner – engineering
 Warren Bruleigh – engineering

Charts

References

Violent Femmes albums
1984 albums
Slash Records albums
Rhino Records albums